Lieutenant General Sarfraz Ali  (13 September 1971 – 2 August 2022) was a Pakistani general. He was the commander of the Pakistan Army's XII Corps from December 2020 until his death in a military helicopter crash on 2 August 2022.

Personal life 
Lieutenant General Sarfraz Ali is survived by a widow, two sons and a daughter. His son is also serving in the Pakistan Army as a Captain and was his ADC. His father served in the Pakistan Air Force.

Career 
He was the recipient of the Tamgha e Basalat  on 2 occasions. His first medal came after a campaign in the Kargil War as a major. His received the bar to his medal for action in Operation Rah-e-Rast as the Commanding officer of his parent battalion. Ali also commanded Pakistani military units during Operation Zarb-e-Azb. Between 2012 and 2014, he commanded the 111 Brigade. He later served as Pakistan's defence attaché in Washington, D.C., United States from 2014 to 2017. In 2018, he was appointed as Commandant of Pakistan Command and Staff College. In October 2018, he was appointed DG Military Intelligence. He was appointed Commander of the XII Corps in December 2020, where he served until his death in August 2022.

Posted as Commander 111th Infantry Brigade
On 12 January 2012, when Lieutenant General Sarfraz Ali, who at the time was a Brigadier, was appointed Commander of the 111th Infantry Brigade, the Pakistani Government, Pakistani media and Indian media speculated that a coup was about to take place due to Lieutenant General Sarfraz Ali's posting at a time when Prime Minister of Pakistan Yousaf Raza Gillani had accused Chief of Army Staff Ashfaq Parvez Kayani and DG ISI Ahmad Shuja Pasha of violating the constitution by submitting "illegal" replies against Zardari to the Supreme Court on the memogate scandal which was sent to the White House where Asif Ali Zardari had begged America to save him from the Pakistan Army. The rumors started by the government and media later turned out to be false because there was no coup and it was just a routine change of command.

Death and funeral 
On 1 August 2022, a Pakistani military helicopter with six officers, including Lieutenant General Sarfraz Ali went missing during flood relief operations in Balochistan. On 2 August 2022, they were all found dead. Their funeral prayers were offered in Quetta on 3 August 2022, with Chief of Army Staff Qamar Javed Bajwa, Lt. Gen. Faiz Hameed, Lt. Gen. Asif Ghafoor, and other high ranking army officers attending. He was buried in Shuhada graveyard in Rawalpindi, Pakistan.

Effective dates of promotion

Awards and decorations

Foreign decorations

Notes

References 

]

2022 deaths
2022 in Balochistan, Pakistan
Pakistani generals
Sindhi people
Victims of aviation accidents or incidents in Pakistan
Victims of aviation accidents or incidents in 2022
Victims of helicopter accidents or incidents
Pakistani military attachés
Pakistan Military Academy alumni
Lieutenant generals
Pakistan Army personnel
Recipients of Hilal-i-Imtiaz
1971 births
Pakistan Army officers
Pakistani diplomats
Military personnel from Karachi
Pakistani Muslims